Desteldonk is a village in the municipality of Ghent in the Belgian province of East Flanders. 

The first historical record of Desteldonk dates back to 966 when it was listed as Thesledung. In 1236, it was named as a parish. Part of the original municipality was already annexed in 1927. It became part of Ghent in 1965.

References

External links

Sub-municipalities of Ghent
Populated places in East Flanders